I discorsi is an album by Italian singer Mina, issued in 1969.

This album is almost identical to previous Le più belle canzoni italiane interpretate da Mina, published the year before and given as a present to readers of some Italian magazines of Rusconi Group. In this album, the tracks "E se domani" and "La musica è finita" were replaced by the songs "I discorsi" and "La canzone di Marinella".

Track listing

Side A

Side B

Mina (Italian singer) albums
1969 albums
Italian-language albums